Rubus gulosus is a North American species of flowering plant in the rose family. It has been found only in the US State of Maine and the adjacent Canadian Province of New Brunswick.

The genetics of Rubus is extremely complex, so that it is difficult to decide on which groups should be recognized as species. There are many rare species with limited ranges such as this. Further study is suggested to clarify the taxonomy.

References

gulosus
Plants described in 1941
Flora of Maine
Flora of New Brunswick
Flora without expected TNC conservation status